"Ça ira" is a song by French singer Joyce Jonathan. It was originally released by her as a single in early 2013. Then the song was included on her studio album Caractère, which appeared in June of the same year.

Writing and composition 
The song was written by Joyce Jonathan and Fabien Nataf. The recording was produced by Jo Francken.

Track listing 
Digital promo single (February 1, 2013) – Polydor (UMG)
 "Ça ira" (3:45)
 		 	 
Digital promo single (July 8, 2013) – Polydor (UMG)
 "Ça ira (Remix)" (3:44)

Charts

References 

2013 songs
2013 singles
French pop songs
Polydor Records singles